David Anthony Dunworth (born 29 August 1946) was a rugby union player who represented Australia.

Dunworth, a prop, was born in Brisbane, Queensland and claimed a total of 5 international rugby caps for Australia.

Dunworth was a Liberal member of the Legislative Assembly of Queensland from 1990 to 1992, representing the electorate of Sherwood from the 1990 by-election to 1992. He contested the electorate of Mount Ommaney at the 1992 election but was defeated.

References

Australian rugby union players
Australia international rugby union players
1946 births
Living people
Members of the Queensland Legislative Assembly
Liberal Party of Australia members of the Parliament of Queensland
Rugby union props
Rugby union players from Brisbane